Success Is the Best Revenge is a 1984 French-British drama film directed by Jerzy Skolimowski and starring Michael York. It was entered into the 1984 Cannes Film Festival.

Cast
 Michael York as Alex Rodak
 Joanna Szczerbic as Alicia Rodak
 Michael Lyndon as Adam Rodak
 Jerry Skol as Tony Rodak
 Michel Piccoli as French Official
 Anouk Aimée as Monique des Fontaines
 John Hurt as Dino Montecurva
 Ric Young as Chinese Waiter
 Claude Le Saché as Monsieur Conio
 Malcolm Sinclair as Assistant Stage Manager
 Hilary Drake as Stage Manager
 Jane Asher as Bank Manager

Production
Success Is the Best Revenge was filmed in London. As the film's producer, Skolimowski decided to mortgage his house (which featured in several scenes) in order to raise funds for the project; when it failed to recoup the investment costs at the box office, he declared himself bankrupt and was forced to sell his home, subsequently leaving Britain for the United States.

Although refraining from starring in the film himself (opting to cast Michael York as his alter ego Alex instead), Skolimowski chose to cast his wife Joanna Szczerbic as Alex's wife and his sons Michał and Jerzy (appearing pseudonymously as Michael Lyndon and Jerry Skol respectively) as Alex's sons Adam and Tony.

References

External links

1984 films
1984 drama films
1984 independent films
British drama films
British independent films
English-language French films
Films directed by Jerzy Skolimowski
Films with screenplays by Jerzy Skolimowski
French drama films
Films scored by Stanley Myers
Films scored by Hans Zimmer
1980s English-language films
1980s British films
1980s French films